Kamienny may refer to the following places in Poland:

Kamienny Bród
Kamienny Dół
Kamienny Dwór
Kamienny Jaz

See also
Kamienny Most